Epistephium is a genus of flowering plants from the orchid family, Orchidaceae. It is native to South America, with a few species in Belize and Trinidad.

Epistephium amabile Schltr.
Epistephium amplexicaule Poepp. & Endl.
Epistephium brevicristatum R.E.Schult.
Epistephium duckei Huber
Epistephium elatum Kunth in F.W.H.von Humboldt, A.J.A.Bonpland & C.S.Kunth
Epistephium ellipticum R.O.Williams & Summerh.   (Belize) 
Epistephium frederici-augusti Rchb.f. & Warsz.
Epistephium hernandii Garay
Epistephium lamprophyllum Schltr.
Epistephium laxiflorum Barb.Rodr.
Epistephium lobulosum Garay
Epistephium lucidum Cogn. in C.F.P.von Martius 
Epistephium matogrossense Hoehne
Epistephium parviflorum Lindl.
Epistephium portellianum Barb.Rodr.
Epistephium praestans Hoehne
Epistephium sclerophyllum Lindl.
Epistephium sessiliflorum Lindl.
Epistephium speciosum Barb.Rodr.
Epistephium subrepens Hoehne
Epistephium williamsii Hook.f.

See also 
 List of Orchidaceae genera

References 

 Pridgeon, A.M., Cribb, P.J., Chase, M.A. & Rasmussen, F. eds. (1999). Genera Orchidacearum 1. Oxford Univ. Press.
 Pridgeon, A.M., Cribb, P.J., Chase, M.A. & Rasmussen, F. eds. (2001). Genera Orchidacearum 2. Oxford Univ. Press.
 Pridgeon, A.M., Cribb, P.J., Chase, M.A. & Rasmussen, F. eds. (2003). Genera Orchidacearum 3. Oxford Univ. Press
 Berg Pana, H. 2005. Handbuch der Orchideen-Namen. Dictionary of Orchid Names. Dizionario dei nomi delle orchidee. Ulmer, Stuttgart

External links 
 
 

Vanilloideae genera
Vanilleae